The Mt. Pleasant Christian Church in Richmond, in Madison County, Kentucky is a historic church.  It was built in c.1849 and added to the National Register of Historic Places in 1989.

It was deemed significant "as an example of how Madison County builders used some of the elements of the Gothic Revival style such as the steeplypitched roof and double-lancet windows to ornament a rural church building."

References

Gothic Revival church buildings in Kentucky
Churches completed in 1849
19th-century churches in the United States
Churches in Madison County, Kentucky
Churches on the National Register of Historic Places in Kentucky
1849 establishments in Kentucky
National Register of Historic Places in Madison County, Kentucky
Richmond, Kentucky